= Abdullah Fouad =

Saudi businessman (1925–2015)

- عبد الله فؤاد
- Born: 1925
- Died: 2015 (aged 89–90)
- Burial place: Dammam
- Occupation: Businessman

Abdullah Fouad (Arabic: عبد الله فؤاد; 1925–2015) was a prominent Saudi businessman and one of the pioneers in the contracting and real estate sectors in the Kingdom. He was the founder of the Abdullah Fouad Group, one of the 100 largest companies in Saudi Arabia.

== Biography ==
Born as Abdullah Abdul Aziz Bubshait in Dammam in 1925, he worked during his early years as a servant for an American family in exchange for English lessons from the wife. In 1944, following the death of his uncle, also named Abdullah Fouad, he returned to Al-Khobar to live with his mother. From then on, he inherited his uncle’s name and became known as Abdullah Fouad.

== Career ==
Fouad began his career in 1940 as a messenger at Aramco.

In 1950, he established the Abdullah Fouad Group, which later became one of Saudi Arabia’s leading companies.

In 1971, he also founded the Abdullah Fouad Establishment, which was responsible for implementing major projects for Aramco and other key developments in the Kingdom.

== Personal life ==
He had two sons and nine daughters.

== Death ==
Abdullah Fouad died in 2015 at the age of 90 and was buried in the Dammam cemetery.
